Bondarzewia kirkii is a species of polypore fungus in the family Russulaceae that is endemic to the beech forests of New Zealand.

Ecology 
Bondarzewia kirkii is a parasitic fungus that fruits on the roots of beech trees throughout New Zealand. It appears to be long lived and to fruit on mature trees. It only has been collected from January through March, significantly earlier than most other macrofungi in New Zealand.

External links 
 Bonzardewia kirkii in Index Fungorum

References 

Fungi described in 2019
Fungi of Oceania
Russulales